Sumner Increase Kimball (September 2, 1834 – June 20, 1923) was the organizer of the United States Life-Saving Service and the General Superintendent of the Life-Saving Service from 1878–1915. Originally a lawyer and a legislative administrator, Kimball spent his life creating and leading the Life-Saving Service, one of the predecessor services that eventually became the US Coast Guard, transforming it from an uneven collection of facilities round the US coastline into a coherent and well-trained organization.

Biography
Sumner Increase Kimball was born in Lebanon, Maine on September 2, 1834. Raised in Sanford, Maine, he graduated from Bowdoin College in 1855, and was admitted to the bar in 1858. He was elected to the Maine House of Representatives in 1859.

He became a clerk in the United States Treasury Department in 1862, and was placed in charge of the Revenue Marine Bureau there in 1871. When the Life-Saving Bureau was organized in 1878 he was appointed its head. Under his direction, the Life-Saving Service was extended to the Pacific Coast and the Great Lakes.  He served as superintendent of the Lifesaving Service for 37 years.

Kimball also served in several other positions at the Treasury Department (acting Register, acting Comptroller, acting Solicitor). He was the author of Organization and Methods of the United States Life-Saving Service (1889) and Joshua James: Life-Saver (1909).

He died at his home in Washington, D.C. on June 20, 1923.

Legacy

The Coast Guard cutter  is named in Kimball's honor. She is a -class cutter, also known as a National Security Cutter. As of 2022, these are the largest and most capable cutters in the Coast Guard fleet. They can perform a wide array of law enforcement duties, as well  coastal defense and anti-terrorism if needed. They can also be called upon by the Department of Defense to work with the US Navy in a both a national defense capacity, as well as performing military  missions overseas.

References

External links
Biography - detailed biography, with photographs, on U.S. Coast Guard website
The United States Life-Saving Service, contemporary article printed in The Bay State Monthly, 1890

Bowdoin College alumni
American non-fiction writers
1834 births
1923 deaths
People from Lebanon, Maine
People from Sanford, Maine
Writers from Maine
Members of the Maine House of Representatives
Clerks
Maine lawyers
19th-century American lawyers